Macradenia is a genus of flowering plants from the orchid family, Orchidaceae. It is native to Latin America, the West Indies and Florida.

Macradenia amazonica Mansf. - Brazil
Macradenia brassavolae Rchb.f. - southern Mexico, Central America, Colombia, Venezuela, Ecuador
Macradenia delicatula Barb.Rodr. - Minas Gerais
Macradenia loxoglottis Focke ex Rchb.f. in W.G.Walpers - Suriname
Macradenia lutescens R.Br. - Florida, Bahamas, Cuba, Dominican Republic, Jamaica, Trinidad, Venezuela, Colombia, Guyana, Suriname, French Guiana, Brazil, Colombia, Ecuador 
Macradenia multiflora (Kraenzl.) Cogn. in C.F.P.von Martius  - Brazil, Paraguay
Macradenia paraensis Barb.Rodr.   - Brazil, Paraguay
Macradenia paulensis Cogn. in C.F.P.von Martius  - Brazil
Macradenia purpureorostrata G.Gerlach - Colombia, Venezuela
Macradenia regnellii Barb.Rodr.  - Minas Gerais
Macradenia rubescens Barb.Rodr.  - Brazil, Venezuela
Macradenia tridentata C.Schweinf. - Peru

See also 
 List of Orchidaceae genera

References

External links 

 
Oncidiinae genera